"All Night" is a song by American rappers Juicy J and Wiz Khalifa; it released  was released on May 13, 2016 by Atlantic Records, Columbia Records, and Empire Distribution. It serves as the lead single from their mixtape, TGOD Mafia: Rude Awakening. It was produced by 808 Mafia member, TM88. The song samples "Lonely Star" by The Weeknd.

Track listing 
Download digital
All Night — 4:05

Release history

References

2016 singles
2016 songs
Wiz Khalifa songs
Juicy J songs
Songs written by Wiz Khalifa
Songs written by Juicy J
Songs written by the Weeknd
Songs written by Doc McKinney
Songs written by Illangelo
Songs written by TM88